Nguyễn Thị Minh Nguyệt (born 16 November 1986) is a retired Vietnamese soccer player who last played as a forward for Hà Nội FC and The Vietnam women's national football team.

International goals

References

External links 
 

1986 births
Living people
Women's association football forwards
Vietnamese women's footballers
Vietnam women's international footballers
Asian Games competitors for Vietnam
Footballers at the 2006 Asian Games
Footballers at the 2010 Asian Games
Footballers at the 2014 Asian Games
Southeast Asian Games silver medalists for Vietnam
Southeast Asian Games medalists in football
Competitors at the 2007 Southeast Asian Games
Competitors at the 2013 Southeast Asian Games
21st-century Vietnamese women